Benjamin James Bowcock (October 28, 1879 – June 16, 1961) was a Major League Baseball second baseman.  He started the last fourteen games of the 1903 season for the St. Louis Browns, who were 65–74 and finished sixth in the American League.  The 23-year-old rookie was a native of Fall River, Massachusetts.

All fourteen of Bowcock's games were played on the road.  He made his major league debut in a September 18 doubleheader against the Philadelphia Athletics at Columbia Park.  His last appearance was on September 28 against the Boston Americans at Huntington Avenue Grounds.  The Browns won 5 and lost 9 while Bowcock was in the lineup, and he faced three Hall of Fame pitchers during that time: Chief Bender, Jack Chesbro, and Cy Young.

During his brief time in the big leagues he showed a strong bat and a weak glove.  He was 16-for-50 (.320) with a slugging percentage of .480.  He had 1 home run, 10 runs batted in, and 7 runs scored.  At second base he made 7 errors in 61 total chances for a fielding percentage of .885, far below the league average of .943.

External links
Baseball Reference
Retrosheet

Major League Baseball second basemen
Baseball players from Massachusetts
St. Louis Browns players
Sportspeople from Fall River, Massachusetts
1879 births
1961 deaths
Fall River Indians players
Columbus Senators players
Little Rock Travelers players
Johnstown Johnnies players
Fall River Brienies players
Portland Duffs players
Lowell Grays players
Seattle Giants players